Luston is a village and civil parish in north Herefordshire. To the south from the village of Luston is the hamlet of The Broad. The population of the civil parish at the 2011 census was 541.

The parish has no church but there is a Methodist chapel in the village. The village primary school opened in September 1968. The local pub is The Balance Inn. The parish hall, shared with the neighbouring village of Eye, is called Cawley Hall after the family who had their seat at nearby Berrington Hall.

References

External links

Civil parishes in Herefordshire
Villages in Herefordshire